Viewdle is a Ukrainian facial recognition company. Google was reportedly close to closing a deal to buy the company for between $30 to $45 million in October 2012. In October 2012, Google bought Viewdle to improve  Android's augmented reality and face recognition. The company is an expert in the field of computer vision.

Viewdle's face and object recognition technologies has been widely used in search technology. In 2011, Google launched its image search based on this technology. 

In 2014, Google closed the company, forcing Ukrainian programmers to move to the US office of Motorola Mobility.

Founding 
Viewdle was founded in 2006 by Yegor Anchishkin and Yuriy Musatenko, who saw a commercial success in the technology developed by the Kyiv Institute of Cybernetics in the field of image recognition. The investment was raised from the businessmen from the Ukrainian diaspora in the USA.

In 2008, Anthem Venture Partners bought a 25% stake of the company's for $2 million. In October 2010, the second round of investment took place with Qualcomm Ventures, BlackBerry Partners Fund and Best Buy Capital which invested $10 million, valuing the company at $13.5 million.

References 

Facial recognition software
Software companies of Ukraine
Google acquisitions